Vishka is a village in Gilan Province, Iran.

Vishka may also refer to:
 Vishka Matir
 Vishka Nanak
 Vishka Suqeh
 Vishka Varzal
 Vishka, Sowme'eh Sara
 Vishka (film)